Efrapeptins are peptides produced by fungi in the genus Tolypocladium that have antifungal, insecticidal, and mitochondrial ATPase inhibitory activities. They are produced via a biosynthetic pathway similar to but simpler than the Ciclosporin pathway, with nonribosomal peptide synthase (NRPS) and/or polyketide synthase (PKS) being the key elements.

The amino acid sequences of efrapeptins are:
Efrapeptin F:    Ac-Pip-Aib-Pip-Aib-Aib-Leu-bAla-Gly-Aib-Aib-Pip-Aib-Ala-Leu-Iva-Unk
Efrapeptin G:    Ac-Pip-Aib-Pip-Iva-Aib-Leu-bAla-Gly-Aib-Aib-Pip-Aib-Ala-Leu-Iva-Unk
Aib: 2-methylalanine; Iva: 2-ethylalanine; Unk: does not match to a known amino acid

References

External links

  - Efrapeptin F 
 Efrapeptin F at ChemSpider
  - Efrapeptin G 
 Efrapeptin G at ChemSpider

Antimicrobial peptides